Giraldo Arango González (29 May 1958 – 28 August 2021) was a Cuban baseball player and coach.

Biography
Born in Los Palacios, González made his debut in the XVIII Cuban National Series, 1978-1979, as a shortstop for Vegueros de Pinar del Río. He remained with the Vegueros for fifteen years.

He participated in national and international events such as Copa José Antonio Huelga, 1982 Central American and Caribbean Games, 1987 Pan American Games, Intercontinental Cup Baseball 1987 and others.

Giraldo González died on 28 August 2021, after contracting COVID-19. He was 63 years old.

References

1958 births
2021 deaths
Cuban baseball players
Baseball shortstops
Vegueros de Pinar del Rio players
People from Pinar del Río Province
Deaths from the COVID-19 pandemic in Cuba
Competitors at the 1982 Central American and Caribbean Games
Baseball players at the 1987 Pan American Games
Pan American Games competitors for Cuba
Pan American Games gold medalists for Cuba
Pan American Games medalists in baseball
Medalists at the 1987 Pan American Games
20th-century Cuban people
21st-century Cuban people